Roman Ruslanovich Tugarinov (born 20 October 1999) is a Russian professional footballer who plays as a defender for La Liga club RCD Espanyol.

Club career
Tugarinov is a former youth academy player of Barcelona and Cornellà. He became the first Russian player to win UEFA Youth League when he won it with Barcelona in 2017–18 season. While on loan at Cornellà, he made his senior team debut on 28 October 2018 in a 1–1 draw against Sabadell. He joined Espanyol in July 2019.

In August 2021, Tugarinov joined Dutch club Telstar on a two-year loan deal with an option to buy. He made his professional debut for the club on 14 November 2021 in a 1–1 draw against De Graafschap.

International career
Tugarinov is a former Russian youth international. He was part of Russian under-20 team which became runners-up at 2018 COTIF Tournament.

Career statistics

Honours
Barcelona
 UEFA Youth League: 2017–18

References

External links
 
 Roman Tugarinov National team profile 

1999 births
Living people
Association football defenders
Russian footballers
Russia youth international footballers
Segunda División B players
Eerste Divisie players
UE Cornellà players
RCD Espanyol B footballers
SC Telstar players
Russian expatriate footballers
Russian expatriate sportspeople in Spain
Russian expatriate sportspeople in the Netherlands
Expatriate footballers in Spain
Expatriate footballers in the Netherlands
People from Ulan-Ude
Sportspeople from Buryatia
FC Barcelona players
FC Barcelona Atlètic players